Ellen Johnston known as "The Factory Girl" (c.1835 – April 12, 1874) was a Scottish power-loom weaver and poet. She is known because of her autobiography and later reevaluations of her working class poetry.

Life 
She was born in Hamilton in Lanarkshire in about 1835. She and her mother were abandoned by her father who emigrated to America (and died there). Her mother remarried and when she was thirteen she joined her step father working a power loom. Her step father sexually abused her and he had started her working at age ten to cure her of her bookish pretensions.

She could read and she enjoyed reading. She was interested particularly in the writings of the Scottish novelist Sir Walter Scott. She was not shy and she hoped one day to be an actress.

She did not get on well with her workmates as she was over keen to please her bosses and she also gave birth to a daughter, Mary Achenvole, without being married in 1852. In 1854 she had her first poem published Lord Raglan's address to the allied armies', in the Glasgow Examiner. 
The Reverend George Gilfillan (the poet) wrote well of her work as did the Duke of Buccleuch although some might have been patronising. She continued to publish poetry in newspapers as "The Factory Girl" and at one point she gave up work due to illness but lack of money took her back. Her mother died in 1861 and she went to live with her aunt in Dundee.

It was said that in 1863 she could not get a job in Dundee because of her unpopularity.

In 1867 she published her autobiography, Poems and Songs of Ellen Johnston, the ‘Factory Girl.

Death and legacy 
Johnston probably died in Glasgow in 1874 as "Helen Johnston" on 12 April in a workhouse. Johnston's poetry was considered by some as of no lasting value, but in 1991 her poem written in dialect "The Last Sark" was published in An Anthology of Scottish Women Poets. In 1998 Gustav Klaus's  biography "Factory Girl: Ellen Johnston and Working-class Poetry in Victorian Scotland" was published. Johnston is studied because she represents the voice of working-class women. In 2007, her autobiography, was reprinted.

References 

1830s births
1874 deaths
Weavers
Scottish poets
People from Lanarkshire